Aditi Chauhan (born 20 November 1992) is an Indian women's professional footballer who plays as a goalkeeper for Lords FA and the Indian national team.

Career
Chauhan and her family moved to Delhi when she was nine years old. She did her schooling from Amity International School. As a child she participated in karate and basketball, even being selected for the youth state basketball team. She was convinced by her coach to attend trials for the football team as a goalkeeper. Chauhan was successful and eventually, appeared on the team for the Delhi women's football team U19 squad.

She attended Loughborough University, completing an MSc in Sports Management and represented their football team. In August 2015, Chauhan joined West Ham United Ladies. She made her debut on 16 August 2015 in a 0–5 defeat by Coventry Ladies and in doing so became the first player from the India national women's team to play competitively in England and the first Indian woman to play in English league football. She spent two seasons with the club before returning to India in early 2018. She went on to join India Rush.

For 2019–20 Indian Women's League, she joined Gokulam Kerala FC.
She also has been the first choice goalkeeper for the Indian National team.

International
Chauhan was selected for trials with the India U19 side at age 17. She was a part of the India women's team that won the 2012 SAFF Women's Championship in Sri Lanka.

Honours
India
SAFF Women's Championship: 2012, 2016, 2019 
 South Asian Games Gold medal: 2016, 2019

Gokulam Kerala
Indian Women's League: 2019–20, 2021–22
AFC Women's Club Championship: third place 2021

Individual
 Asian Football Awards: Women in Football Award 2015

See also
 List of Indian football players in foreign leagues

References

External links 
 
 Aditi Chauhan at All India Football Federation
 

1992 births
Living people
Sportswomen from Delhi
Indian women's footballers
India women's international footballers
India women's youth international footballers
Indian expatriate sportspeople in the United Kingdom
Footballers from Delhi
Footballers at the 2014 Asian Games
Indian expatriate women's footballers
Expatriate women's footballers in England
Women's association football goalkeepers
West Ham United F.C. Women players
Gokulam Kerala FC Women players
Alumni of Loughborough University
21st-century Indian women
21st-century Indian people
Asian Games competitors for India
South Asian Games gold medalists for India
South Asian Games medalists in football
Indian Women's League players